Kadyos, baboy, kag lanka, commonly shortened to KBL, is a Filipino pork soup or stew originating from the Hiligaynon people of the Western Visayas islands. The name of the dish means "pigeon peas, pork, and jackfruit"; the three main ingredients. The soup is also traditionally soured with batuan fruits (Garcinia binucao). Other souring agents like tamarind can also be used. Other ingredients include leafy greens (like young sweet potato leaves, cabbage, or bokchoi), lemongrass, fish sauce, onions, and siling haba peppers. The pork cut used is typically the hock (pata). The dish is characteristically purple in color due to the use of pigeon peas. It is similar to another Hiligaynon dish known as kadyos, manok, kag ubad which uses chicken and banana pith instead.

See also
 Cansi
 Linat-an
 Filipino cuisine
 List of soups
 List of stews

References

Philippine soups
Philippine stews
Philippine pork dishes
Visayan cuisine